The 2020 Copa CONMEBOL Libertadores was the 61st edition of the CONMEBOL Libertadores (also referred to as the Copa Libertadores), South America's premier club football tournament organized by CONMEBOL.

On 17 October 2019, CONMEBOL announced that the final would be played at the Maracanã in Rio de Janeiro, Brazil on 21 November 2020. Brazilian club Palmeiras defeated fellow Brazilian club Santos by a 1–0 score in the final to win their second tournament title. As champions, Palmeiras qualified for the 2020 FIFA Club World Cup in Qatar, and earned the right to play against the winners of the 2020 Copa Sudamericana in the 2021 Recopa Sudamericana. They also automatically qualified for the 2021 Copa Libertadores group stage. Flamengo were the defending champions, but were eliminated by Racing in the round of 16.

In March 2018, the Liga MX President, Enrique Bonilla, said that Liga MX and Major League Soccer (MLS) were open to start talks to have Mexican teams return and MLS teams from Canada and the United States to join if they could agree on terms with the CONMEBOL officials. Teams from Mexico had withdrawn from the Copa Libertadores since 2017, but could return in the future if the issue of schedule conflicts could be solved.

On 21 May 2019, CONMEBOL announced that clubs must pass certain eligibility requirements in order to compete in the 2020 Copa Libertadores and Copa Sudamericana. One of the original requirements was that teams must be in the top division of their member association, but this was removed after many associations stated that they had not adapted the regulations of their qualifying competitions for the 2020 Copa Libertadores and Copa Sudamericana.

The tournament was suspended after group stage matchday 2 due to the COVID-19 pandemic, and resumed on 15 September 2020, ending with the final on 30 January 2021.

Teams
The following 47 teams from the 10 CONMEBOL member associations qualified for the tournament:
Copa Libertadores champions
Copa Sudamericana champions
Brazil: 7 berths
Argentina: 6 berths
All other associations: 4 berths each

The entry stage was determined as follows:
Group stage: 28 teams
Copa Libertadores champions
Copa Sudamericana champions
Teams which qualified for berths 1–5 from Argentina and Brazil
Teams which qualified for berths 1–2 from all other associations
Second stage: 13 teams
Teams which qualified for berths 6–7 from Brazil
Team which qualified for berth 6 from Argentina
Teams which qualified for berths 3–4 from Chile and Colombia
Teams which qualified for berth 3 from all other associations
First stage: 6 teams
Teams which qualified for berth 4 from Bolivia, Ecuador, Paraguay, Peru, Uruguay and Venezuela

Schedule
The schedule of the competition was as follows.

On 12 March 2020, CONMEBOL announced that the tournament would be temporarily suspended after matchday 2 due to the COVID-19 pandemic, with matches on matchday 3, originally scheduled for 17–19 March 2020, postponed to a later date yet to be confirmed. On 18 March 2020, CONMEBOL announced that the tournament would be suspended until 5 May 2020. On 17 April 2020, CONMEBOL announced that the tournament would be suspended indefinitely, and no date had been set for its resumption. On 10 July 2020, CONMEBOL announced the new schedule for the remainder of the competition.

Draws

Qualifying stages

First stage

Second stage

Third stage

Copa Sudamericana qualification

Group stage

Group A

Group B

Group C

Group D

Group E

Group F

Group G

Group H

Final stages

Qualified teams
The winners and runners-up of each of the eight groups in the group stage advanced to the round of 16.

Seeding

Bracket

Round of 16

Quarter-finals

Semi-finals

Final

Statistics

Top scorers

Team of the tournament
The CONMEBOL technical study group; conformed by Nery Pumpido, Gerardo Pelusso, Diego Gavilán, Faryd Mondragón, Francisco Maturana, Dorival Júnior, Daniel Bañales and César Sampaio, selected the following 11 players as the team of the tournament. All players belong to one of the 4 semi-finalist teams.

See also
2020 Copa Sudamericana
2021 Recopa Sudamericana

References

External links
CONMEBOL Libertadores 2020, CONMEBOL.com

 
2020
1
Association football events postponed due to the COVID-19 pandemic